The name of Mazda MX may refer to:
Mazda MX-3
Mazda MX-5
Mazda MX-6
Mazda MX-30